This is a list of members of the Australian Senate between 2011 and 2014. Half of the state senators had been elected at the November 2007 election and had terms due to finish on 30 June 2014; the other half of the state senators were elected at the August 2010 election and had terms due to finish on 30 June 2017. The territory senators were elected at the August 2010 election and their terms ended at the next federal election, which was September 2013. The new Senate first met in July 2011, with state senators elected in 2010 sworn in on 4 July 2011.

Notes

References

Members of Australian parliaments by term
21st-century Australian politicians
Australian Senate lists
2010s politics-related lists